Kincraig is a village located north of Kingussie and south of Aviemore in Highland, Scotland. Its original name was Boat of Inch, reflecting the ferry boat crossing of the Spey River that once operated here. The name was changed after a single track bridge was erected around 1871.

The village lies at the side of the former A9 road, the B9152, and close to the current A9 dual carriageway. It is close to Loch Insh which is fed from and drains into the river Spey. It has a pub and village hall but Kincraig Stores and Post Office which traded continuously for 120 years closed in July 2016. It was reopened in June 2019 as 'Old Post Office Cafe Gallery'. The main Perth to Inverness railway passes through, although the station closed in 1965.

There is a mix of housing ages and types, from Victorian stone build cottages and villas, through 1930s terraces, to 1980s' individually designed detached houses in their own plots to a 1990s estate of detached houses.

Alvie Primary School is located at the north end, the Loch Inch Outdoor Centre about 2 miles south east and The Highland Wildlife Park about 3 miles south west.

References

External links
 http://www.lochinsh.com/
Cairngorms Park Info and Accommodation site

Populated places in Badenoch and Strathspey